Erik Øckenholt Larsen (born 23 August 1880, date of death unknown) was a Danish tennis player at the beginning of the 20th century.

Career 
Larsen was one of the first players from Denmark – the other being Thorkil Hillerup – to compete at the Wimbledon Championships in singles in 1905. He lost his first round match against William Larned. In 1913, he reached the fourth round which remained his best result at the tournament. That same year he reached the final of the British Covered Court Championships which he lost in four sets to Percival Davson.

Larson won the title at the Danish championships from 1905 to 1908. In addition, he competed in the singles and mixed doubles competition (with Sofie Castenschiold) at the 1912 Summer Olympics, but couldn't win any medal.

References

External links
 
 

1880 births
Year of death missing
Danish male tennis players
Olympic tennis players of Denmark
Tennis players at the 1912 Summer Olympics
Sportspeople from Copenhagen